The Western Missouri Conference, or WEMO, is a high school athletic conference comprising small-size high schools located in central western Missouri. The conference members are located in Barton, Bates, Cass, Jasper, and St. Clair counties.

Members
The conference consists of mostly of Class 1 and Class 2 schools (in boys' basketball), the two smallest classes in Missouri.  Adrian is a Class 3 school in boys' basketball.

With Jasper and Liberal, the Western Missouri Conference stretches from the KC metro area to the Joplin metro area.

References

Missouri high school athletic conferences
High school sports conferences and leagues in the United States